For 2005, Mexico was granted a third berth in the Libertadores. The Mexican federation decided to grant one of its Libertadores berths ("Mexico 1") based strictly on play during the league season, but retained InterLiga for the other two spots ("Mexico 2" and "Mexico 3"). The group phase of InterLiga remained the same as in 2004, but the final games were changed. The top team from each group plays the second-place team from the opposite group, with both winners advancing to Copa Libertadores. Of the two final winners, the one with the highest point total during group play will be designated "Mexico 2" and automatically advance to the group stage. The other final winner will be "Mexico 3", and will enter the preliminary round of Copa Libertadores.

The 2005 InterLiga was again played in California and Texas, and expanded into Arizona. The finals were held January 12 at Reliant Stadium in Houston.

The eight qualified clubs participated in the following groups:

Match Schedule 
Matches at Bank One Ballpark (Phoenix, Arizona)

Matches at The Home Depot Center (Carson, California)

Matches at Spartan Stadium (San Jose, California)

Matches at Alamodome (San Antonio, Texas)

Matches at Cotton Bowl (Dallas, Texas)

Matches at Reliant Stadium (Houston, Texas)

Goalscorers 
The scorers from the 2005 InterLiga

2005
Inter